Cophomantella elaphopis is a moth in the family Lecithoceridae. It was described by Edward Meyrick in 1910. It is known from Assam, India.

The wingspan is 18–20 mm. The forewings are dark shining bronzy brown with the discal stigmata large, cloudy and dark purple fuscous. The hindwings are rather dark grey.

References

Moths described in 1910
Cophomantella
Taxa named by Edward Meyrick